Hasard suivi de Angoli Mala is the title given to a book with two novellas, written in French by French Nobel laureate writer J. M. G. Le Clézio.

Contents
Two novels "Hasard" and "Angoli Mala" in one book

Reviews

Hasard

Angoli Mala

References

1999 French novels
Novels by J. M. G. Le Clézio
French novellas
Works by J. M. G. Le Clézio
Éditions Gallimard books